The 385th Infantry Division, (German: 385. Infanterie-Division) also known as a "Rheingold" Division, was created on 10 January 1942 in Fallingbostel. The division was composed of replacement troops from military districts VI, X and XI. From April 16, 1942, the 385th Infantry Division moved to the Roslavl area and fought in the front lines at the Fomino area. 

The division was annihilated near the Don River during the Battle of Stalingrad in early 1943 while subordinated to the 8th Italian Army. It was disbanded in the period from February to March 1943 and its survivors joined the 387th Infantry Division.

Commanding officers
General der Infanterie Karl Eibl, 7 January 1942 – 18 December 1942 (KIA)
Generalmajor Eberhard von Schuckmann, 18 December 1942 – 15 February 1943

Notes

References

 

Military units and formations established in 1942
Military units and formations disestablished in 1943
Infantry divisions of Germany during World War II